Pregarje is a village west of Ilirska Bistrica in the Inner Carniola region of Slovenia. It is the centre of the Brkini Hills region.

The parish church in the settlement is dedicated to Saint Lawrence and belongs to the Koper Diocese.

References

External links

Pregarje on Geopedia

Populated places in the Municipality of Ilirska Bistrica